"Drill, baby, drill!" was a 2008 Republican campaign slogan first used at the 2008 Republican National Convention by former Maryland Lieutenant Governor Michael Steele, who was later elected Chairman of the Republican National Committee. The slogan expressed support for increased drilling for petroleum and gas as sources of additional energy and gained further prominence after it was used by Republican Vice Presidential nominee Sarah Palin during the vice-presidential debate.

Vice Presidential debate
On October 2, 2008, at the vice-presidential debate between Sarah Palin and Joe Biden, "drill, baby, drill" reached a new prominence. Joe Biden, referring to the energy crisis and McCain's 20 votes against funding solar and wind energy, stated that McCain thinks "the only answer is drill, drill, drill. Drill we must, but it will take 10 years for one drop of oil to come out of any of the wells that are going to be drilled."  Palin responded by saying, "The chant is 'drill, baby, drill.' And that's what we hear all across this country in our rallies because people are so hungry for those domestic sources of energy to be tapped into."

Aftermath of the BP oil spill
Republicans continued to use the slogan after the 2008 election. In 2010, however, the slogan received renewed attention because of the Deepwater Horizon oil spill, a major oil spill at a BP offshore drilling rig in the Gulf of Mexico.  The spill caused extensive environmental damages and economic losses estimated in the billions of dollars.  As a result, some proponents of "Drill, baby, drill" became embarrassed about their previous support. The slogan was parodied as "Spill, baby, spill", and "Kill, baby, Kill". Two senior Republican Senators, Jon Kyl and Pat Roberts, made comments attempting to distance themselves and the Republican Party from the slogan.

Parody

One of several adult film parodies that featured Sarah Palin-like characters was titled Drill Baby Drill by Penthouse Features.

Legacy
Fred Krupp of the Environmental Defense Fund in 2014 harkened back to the "drill baby" phrase as he launched a renewed effort to limit the environmental impact of hydraulic fracturing (fracking).

See also
Bakken formation
Oil discovery
United States offshore drilling debate

References

American political catchphrases
Michael Steele
Petroleum in the United States
2008 United States presidential election
Climate change denial